Emmanuel Legaspi (2 September 1967 – 7 May 2006) was a Filipino-American boxer. He competed for the Philippines in the men's middleweight event at the 1988 Summer Olympics. He was killed in action in 2006 while serving in the U.S. Army in Iraq.

Personal life
Legaspi served as a staff sergeant in the 1st Armored Division of the United States Army during Operation Iraqi Freedom. He died of wounds on 7 May 2006 after his unit came under enemy small-arms fire in Tal Afar.

References

External links
 

1967 births
2006 deaths
Filipino male boxers
Olympic boxers of the Philippines
Boxers at the 1988 Summer Olympics
Middleweight boxers
Sportspeople from Las Vegas
United States Army personnel of the Iraq War
American military personnel killed in the Iraq War
United States Army non-commissioned officers
Olympians killed in warfare